Perenniporia minor is a poroid fungus in the family Polyporaceae. It was described as a new species in 2008 by mycologists Yu-Cheng Dai and Hong-Xia Xiong.

More than 20 species of genus Perenniporia have been found in China. It is this feature to which the specific epithet minor refers. The colour of the cap surface is initially pale buff, darkening slightly with age. The pores on the undersurface of the cap and tiny and round, numbering 4–6 per millimetre. Microscopically, the fungus is characterized by the almost negative reaction of the skeletal hyphae to Melzer's reagent.

References

Perenniporia
Fungi described in 2008
Fungi of China
Taxa named by Yu-Cheng Dai